Robin or Robyn Hughes may refer to:

Robin Hughes (actor) (1920–1989), British actor
Robin Hughes (filmmaker), Australian filmmaker
Robyn Hughes, New Zealand politician